Entertainment Technology Partners (ETP) is a global multi-brand entertainment technology company headquartered in Orlando. As of January 2018, the firm owns four audiovisual technology companies: 
LMG, LLC, EventEQ, Systems Innovation, and Pixl Evolution. ETP has 13 locations throughout the United States and United Kingdom and more than 400 employees.

Brands
LMG 
LMG Touring & Entertainment
Systems Innovation 
EventEQ
The CoiL Learning Center
Pixl Evolution

References

External links
Official website

Companies based in Orlando, Florida
Entertainment companies established in 2014
Privately held companies based in Florida
American companies established in 2014
2014 establishments in Florida